Elections to Barnsley Metropolitan Borough Council were held on 7 May 1987, with one third of the council up for election. Prior to the election, the defending councillor in Ardsley had won the seat for Labour in an uncontested by-election and subsequently defected to Independent Labour The election resulted in Labour retaining control of the council.

Election result

This resulted in the following composition of the council:

Ward results

+/- figures represent changes from the last time these wards were contested.

References

1987 English local elections
1987
1980s in South Yorkshire